The Gillespie V. Montgomery Lock (formerly named Lock E) is part of the Tennessee-Tombigbee Waterway (popularly known as the Tenn-Tom). It is located in north Itawamba County, Mississippi, close to the Prentiss County line.

It is the northernmost of a series of five locks within the Tenn-Tom referred to as the "Chain of Lakes" or "Canal" section.  The lock has a lift of 30 feet and cost US$30 million.

Formerly known simply as Lock E, the lock was later renamed for Gillespie V. "Sonny" Montgomery, a former member of the United States House of Representatives from eastern Mississippi.

Buildings and structures in Itawamba County, Mississippi
Tennessee–Tombigbee Waterway